In Greek mythology, Phorbas (Ancient Greek: Φόρβας gen. Φόρβαντος) or Phorbaceus was a prince of the Thessalian Phlegyes who emigrated to Elis in the Peloponnesos.

Family 
Phorbas was the son of Lapithes and Orsinome, and a brother of Periphas.

Mythology 
Phorbas assisted Alector, king of Elis, in the war against Pelops, and shared the kingdom with him. He married Hyrmine, sister of Alector, and gave his daughter Diogeneia in marriage to Alector. His sons with Hyrmine were Augeas, Actor and Tiphys, all three were Argonauts. 

Phorbas was said to have been a lover of Apollo, and a bold boxer who attacked travelers on the road and was eventually defeated by Apollo.

Notes

References 

 Diodorus Siculus, The Library of History translated by Charles Henry Oldfather. Twelve volumes. Loeb Classical Library. Cambridge, Massachusetts: Harvard University Press; London: William Heinemann, Ltd. 1989. Vol. 3. Books 4.59–8. Online version at Bill Thayer's Web Site
 Diodorus Siculus, Bibliotheca Historica. Vol 1-2. Immanel Bekker. Ludwig Dindorf. Friedrich Vogel. in aedibus B. G. Teubneri. Leipzig. 1888–1890. Greek text available at the Perseus Digital Library.
 Pausanias, Description of Greece with an English Translation by W.H.S. Jones, Litt.D., and H.A. Ormerod, M.A., in 4 Volumes. Cambridge, MA, Harvard University Press; London, William Heinemann Ltd. 1918. . Online version at the Perseus Digital Library
Pausanias, Graeciae Descriptio. 3 vols. Leipzig, Teubner. 1903.  Greek text available at the Perseus Digital Library.
 Pseudo-Apollodorus, The Library with an English Translation by Sir James George Frazer, F.B.A., F.R.S. in 2 Volumes, Cambridge, MA, Harvard University Press; London, William Heinemann Ltd. 1921. . Online version at the Perseus Digital Library. Greek text available from the same website.
 Publius Ovidius Naso, Metamorphoses translated by Brookes More (1859-1942). Boston, Cornhill Publishing Co. 1922. Online version at the Perseus Digital Library.
 Publius Ovidius Naso, Metamorphoses. Hugo Magnus. Gotha (Germany). Friedr. Andr. Perthes. 1892. Latin text available at the Perseus Digital Library.

Princes in Greek mythology
Elean characters in Greek mythology
Thessalian characters in Greek mythology
Elean mythology
Thessalian mythology